The Lin Hsien-tang Residence Museum is a museum in Wufeng District, Taichung, Taiwan.

History
The museum building used to be the residence of Lin Hsien-tang. The inner and outer wings of the construction of the first courtyard of the residence were completed in 1867. In 1883, the second courtyard was completed. The rear tower was completed in 1899. Lin Fang-ying, a descendant of Lin Hsien-tang's, opened the residence as a museum in May 2019.

Architecture
The museum is located inside Mingtai High School compound.

See also
 List of museums in Taiwan

References

1899 establishments in Taiwan
Historic house museums in Taiwan
Houses completed in 1899
Museums established in 2019
Museums in Taichung